Pterocymbium tinctorium is a tropical forest tree species in the family Malvaceae, subfamily Sterculioideae (previously placed in the Sterculiaceae).  In Vietnam, it is known as dực nang nhuộm. In Indonesia, it is called kelumbuk, where it is a significant timber tree growing to about 25 m high. In the Philippines it is called malasapsap.

Subspecies 
The Catalogue of Life lists the following:
 P. tinctorium var. glabrifolium  (Kurz) Thoth.  - Andaman and Nicobar islands
 P. tinctorium var. javanicum  (R. Br.) Kosterm.  - Indo-China, Malesia.

Gallery 

The pictures above show the trunk and canopy of P. tinctorium at the end of the dry season.

References

External links 

Sterculioideae
Flora of tropical Asia
Taxa named by Francisco Manuel Blanco